Hlboké nad Váhom is a village and municipality in Bytča District in the Žilina Region of northern Slovakia.

History
In historical records the village was first mentioned in 1347.

Geography
The municipality lies at an altitude of 347 metres and covers an area of 5.359 km². It has a population of about 915 people.

Genealogical resources

The records for genealogical research are available at the state archive "Statny Archiv in Bytca, Slovakia"

See also
 List of municipalities and towns in Slovakia

External links
https://web.archive.org/web/20080208225314/http://www.statistics.sk/mosmis/eng/run.html
Surnames of living people in Hlboke nad Vahom

Villages and municipalities in Bytča District